Theophylact Simocatta (Byzantine Greek: Θεοφύλακτος Σιμοκάτ(τ)ης Theophýlaktos Simokát(t)ēs) was an early seventh-century Byzantine historiographer, arguably ranking as the last historian of Late Antiquity, writing in the time of Heraclius (c. 630) about the late Emperor Maurice (582–602).

Life

Simocatta is best known as the author of History, a work split into eight books, about the reign of the emperor  Maurice (582–602), for which period he is the best and oldest authority. Though his work is of lesser stature than that of Procopius and his self-consciously classicizing style is pompous, he is an important source of information concerning the seventh-century Slavs, the Avars and the Persians, and the emperor's tragic end. He mentions the war of Heraclius against the Persians (610–28), but not that against the Arabs (beginning 629), so it is likely that he was writing around 630. Among his sources he used the history of John of Epiphania.

Edward Gibbon wrote: His want of judgement renders him diffuse in trifles and concise in the most interesting facts. This notwithstanding, Simocatta's general trustworthiness is admitted. The history contains an introduction in the form of a dialogue between History and Philosophy.

Nicolaus Copernicus translated Greek verses by Theophylact into Latin prose and had his translation, dedicated to his uncle Lucas Watzenrode, published in Kraków in 1509 by Johann Haller. It was the only book that Copernicus ever brought out on his own account.

Simocatta was also the author of Physical Problems, a work on natural history, and of a collection of 85 essays in epistolary form.

In regards to the Far East, Simocatta wrote a generally accurate depiction of the reunification of China by Emperor Wen (r. 581–604 AD) of the Sui Dynasty, with the conquest of the rival Chen Dynasty in southern China, correctly placing these events within the reign period of Byzantine ruler Maurice. Simocatta also provided cursory information about the geography of China along with its customs and culture, deeming its people "idolatrous" but wise in governance. He also related how the ruler was named Taisson, the meaning of which was "Son of God", possibly derived from Chinese Tianzi (Son of Heaven, a title of the emperor of China) or even the name of the contemporaneous ruler Emperor Taizong of Tang.

Works

Notes

References
Michael and Mary Whitby, translators, The History of Theophylact Simocatta: An English Translation with Introduction, Oxford University Press, 1986, 9780198227991
Angus Armitage, The World of Copernicus, New York, Mentor Books, 1947.
 Yule, Henry (1915). Henri Cordier (ed.), Cathay and the Way Thither: Being a Collection of Medieval Notices of China, Vol I: Preliminary Essay on the Intercourse Between China and the Western Nations Previous to the Discovery of the Cape Route. London: Hakluyt Society. Accessed 21 September 2016.

External links

Greek Opera Omnia by Migne Patrologia Graeca with analytical indexes
Raw Greek OCR of Carl de Boor's Teubner edition Theophylacti Simocattae Historiae (1887) from the Lace collection at Mount Allison University.

7th-century Byzantine historians
Year of birth unknown
Year of death unknown
Nicolaus Copernicus